Aurora is an unincorporated community and census-designated place in southeastern Preston County, West Virginia, United States. As of the 2010 census, its population was 201. Aurora is located on U.S. Route 50 between the Maryland state line and the town of Rowlesburg. Cathedral State Park is located to the east of Aurora's post office.

History
Aurora was originally a German settlement. The town was originally called Salem and later Mount Carmel. Its current name was suggested because of the town's high altitude.
One of the original settlers to the area was John Stough, a Lutheran minister. The primary industries throughout the early and mid-19th century were farming and timber.  In the late 1880s, the town became known as a resort area as the result of several large hotels which were built in the area. Some of these featured casinos, pools, and concert halls. In the 1930s an artist colony formed in the nearby Youghiogheny Forest area.

Located near Aurora are the Brookside Historic District, Gaymont and the Red Horse Tavern, listed on the National Register of Historic Places.

References

Northwestern Turnpike
Census-designated places in Preston County, West Virginia
Census-designated places in West Virginia
Morgantown metropolitan area
German-American culture in West Virginia